Lucy Troisi is a former Canadian politician and public servant who was appointed to represent Ward 28 Toronto Centre-Rosedale on Toronto City Council on November 2, 2017 to December 1, 2018.

Background 
Troisi grew up in Regent Park and lives in Cabbagetown. At the time of her appointment to council, Troisi was executive director of the Cabbagetown Youth Centre. She was a manager with the Toronto Parks Forestry & Recreation Division from 1996 to 2005.

Toronto City Council 
Ward 28 became vacant following the death of Councillor Pam McConnell, and council voted to fill appoint a new councillor for the remaining year of the term. Troisi won the appointment on the second ballot, in a council vote that split along ideological lines between conservative (primarily suburban) councillors who favoured Troisi, and progressive (primarily 'downtown') councillors who favoured activist and McConnell staffer Michael Creek. She committed to continuing the mandate McConnell was elected on.

2018 election 
Troisi initially did not intend to contest 2018 Toronto municipal election, however, after the decision by the provincial government to reduce the number of wards, she later changed her mind and ran in Ward 13 Toronto Centre against fellow councillor Kristyn Wong-Tam, and former Ontario deputy premier George Smitherman. She placed third.

Electoral record

References

21st-century Canadian politicians
21st-century Canadian women politicians
Toronto city councillors
Women in Ontario politics
Women municipal councillors in Canada
Living people
Year of birth missing (living people)